Peyreleau is a commune in the Aveyron department in southern France. It lies on the river Jonte, close to its confluence with the Tarn.

Population

See also
 Communes of the Aveyron department

References

Communes of Aveyron
Aveyron communes articles needing translation from French Wikipedia